The Jama Mosque or Jumma Mosque is a mosque in Bridgetown, Barbados.

History
In 1949, a 622 m2 piece of land where the mosque stands today was purchased. The mosque was then constructed by Mohammad Yusuf Degia. The mosque was officially opened on 26 January 1951. In the mid 1980s, the mosque underwent renovation for expansion and completed in the late 1980s.

Architecture
The mosque is the largest one in the country. It was built using local coral stones and decoration blocks were made with star-shaped design. The green glass windows of the mosque were brought in from Germany. The original mosque building opened in 1951 could accommodate 95 worshippers, but after the 1980s renovation, it now can accommodate up to 528 worshippers.

Transportation
The mosque is accessible within talking distance east of Port of Bridgetown.

See also
 Islam in Barbados

References

External links
 

1951 establishments in Barbados
Buildings and structures in Bridgetown
Mosques completed in 1951
Mosques in Barbados